Longages-Noé is a railway station near Longages and Noé, Occitanie, France. The station is on the Toulouse–Bayonne railway. The station is served by TER (local) services operated by the SNCF.

Train services
The following services currently call at Longages-Noé:
local service (TER Occitanie) Toulouse–Saint-Gaudens–Tarbes–Pau

References

Railway stations in France opened in 1862
Railway stations in Haute-Garonne